Dilly Court is an English author of popular historical fiction and family saga novels also writing under the pseudonym of Lily Baxter.

Biography 
She grew up in north east London and now resides in Dorset, she began her career writing scripts for television commercials, as of 2020 she had more than 30 novels published, and appearing on The Sunday Times Bestseller List for several titles including The Button Box.

Selected works 

 Mermaid's Singing	December (December, 2005)
 Tilly True	November (November, 2006)
 The Best of Sisters (January, 2007)
 A Mother's Courage (March, 2008)
 The Constant Heart	(July, 2008)
 A Mother's Promise	(January, 2009)
 The Cockney Angel	(August, 2009)
 A Mother's Wish	(January, 2010)
 The Ragged Heiress	(September, 2010)
 A Mother's Secret	 (November, 2010)
 The Cockney Sparrow	(April, 2011)
 The Dollmaker's Daughters	(April, 2011)
 Cinderella Sister (June, 2011)
 A Mother's Trust (November, 2011)
 The Lady's Maid	(June, 2012)
 The Best of Daughters (November, 2012)
 The Workhouse Girl	(June, 2013)
 The Beggar Maid(September, 2014)
 A Place Called Home (November, 2014)
 The Orphan's Dream	(September, 2015
 Ragged Rose	(February, 2016)
 The Swan Maid	June (June, 2016)
 The Christmas Card (November, 2016)
 The Button Box	(June, 2017)
 The Mistletoe Seller	(November, 2017)
 A Loving Family	(June, 2019)
 Nettie's Secret	(August, 2019)
 Rag-and-Bone Christmas (October, 2020)
 The Reluctant Heiress	(May, 2021)

Series
The River Maid series
 "The River Maid" (January, 2018)
 "The Summer Maiden" (June, 2018)
 "The Christmas Rose" (November, 2018)

The Village Secrets series
 "The Christmas Wedding" (October, 2019)
 "The Country Bride" (June, 2020)
 "A Village Scandal" (March, 2020)

The Rockwood Chronicles
 Fortune's Daughter (October, 2021)
 Winter Wedding (January, 2022)
 Runaway Widow (May, 2022)
 Sunday's Child (August, 2022)
 Snow Bride (October, 2022)
 Dolly's Dream (February, 2023)

As Lily Baxter 

 Poppy's War (July, 2010)
 We'll Meet Again (January, 2011)
 Spitfire Girl (July, 2011)
 The Girls in Blue (July, 2012)
 The Shopkeeper's Daughter (July, 2013)
 In Love and War (July, 2014)

References

External links
 Dilly Court Fiction DB 
 Dilly Court  Official website
 Dilly Court HarperCollins

English historical novelists
Year of birth missing (living people)
Living people